Joe Baillie (26 February 1929 – 23 March 1966) was a Scottish footballer who played as a defender, making over 100 appearances for Celtic before moving to English football.

Career
Baillie played the majority of his games for Celtic for whom his debut was against Queen of the South. He was best known at Celtic for his partnership at left-half with Celtic legend Bobby Evans which helped the team lift the 1951 Scottish Cup. He had joined the club in 1946 and remained with the Bhoys for eight years. He made 171 first team appearances for Celtic, scoring one goal. During his time with Celtic, Baillie represented the Scottish League XI three times.

In 1954 he moved south to join then-English champions Wolverhampton Wanderers. However at Molineux he managed only one first team appearance (a 6–4 win against Huddersfield in February 1955).

He moved to Bristol City in 1956 where he had an equally brief stay.

He next again gave him regular football when he joined Leicester City in summer 1957. His manager when he joined Leicester was another Scot, Dumfries born Dave Halliday. Leicester stayed in England's top flight through Baillie's three seasons there.

He ended his playing career by contributing to a promotion-winning season at Fourth Division Bradford Park Avenue before retiring in 1961.

Death
He drowned after his car crashed into the bridge over the River Kelvin in the Maryhill district of Glasgow in March 1966.

Honours

 Celtic - 1951 Scottish Cup winners
 Bradford Park Avenue - 1961 Fourth Division promotion

References

 Celtic: A Complete Record 1888-1992, Paul Lunney,

External links

1929 births
1966 deaths
Bradford (Park Avenue) A.F.C. players
Bristol City F.C. players
Celtic F.C. players
Association football defenders
Leicester City F.C. players
Scottish Football League players
Scottish footballers
English Football League players
Wolverhampton Wanderers F.C. players
St Roch's F.C. players
Footballers from Dumfries
Scottish Football League representative players
Deaths by drowning in the United Kingdom
Road incident deaths in Scotland